Md. Alauddin (7 January 1925 - 26 February 2000) was a Bangladesh Awami League politician and the former Member of Parliament of Rajshahi-14 and Rajshahi-5.

Career
Alauddin was elected to parliament from Rajshahi-5 as a Bangladesh Nationalist Party candidate in 1996. He joined the First Sheikh Hasina Cabinet, of Bangladesh Awami League, as a State Minister. He subsequently lost his parliamentary membership for crossing over to a different party and re-elected from Rajshahi-5 as a Bangladesh Awami League candidate.

References

Awami League politicians
1925 births
7th Jatiya Sangsad members
2000 deaths
1st Jatiya Sangsad members